Sergey Anatolyevich Komissarov (born 3 December 1987) is a Russian competitive sailor. He competed at the 2016 Summer Olympics in Rio de Janeiro, in the men's Laser class.

References

External links

1987 births
Living people
Russian male sailors (sport)
Olympic sailors of Russia
Sailors at the 2016 Summer Olympics – Laser
Universiade medalists in sailing
Universiade bronze medalists for Russia
Medalists at the 2011 Summer Universiade
Sailors at the 2020 Summer Olympics – Laser